Quincy Medical Center was a 124-year-old teaching hospital located in Quincy, Massachusetts.  It was operated by Steward Health Care System the largest fully integrated community care organization in New England.

The hospital's maternity ward was closed in 1998 but was expected to reopen.  The remainder of the hospital was closed on December 26, 2014, after receiving a waiver from the department of health of the 90-day public notification rule. 

It was originally scheduled to close December 31, 2014 despite a legal agreement with the state's attorney general's office it made when purchasing the hospital from bankruptcy in 2011 which stated it would not close the hospital before 2017.  Steward did agree to maintain an emergency room open under the license of Carney Hospital, Steward's facility in Dorchester in an off site location until the end of 2015.  Any inpatient care would be transferred to other hospitals.

Brook Thurston, a spokesman from Steward Health Care System, responded to the controversy that Steward plans to close Quincy Medical stating "North Adams and Radius (which Steward owned) gave virtually no notice and no transition plan."

Quincy, a city of over 90,000 people, has become the largest city in Massachusetts without a hospital.

References

External links 
 Official site

Hospitals in Norfolk County, Massachusetts
Buildings and structures in Quincy, Massachusetts